The Seiran Sho (in Japanese: 青藍賞), is a race for three and four year olds in the Iwate Horse Racing Association. The race has an "M2" grade rating.

Race details

The race was originally created to celebrate the 30th anniversary of the Iwate Horse Racing Association.

The race was originally 2,000 meters, but changed to 1,600 meters in 2000.

The race has been held at both Mizusawa Racecourse and Morioka Racecourse.

Winners since 2014

Past winners

Past winners include:

See also
 Horse racing in Japan
 List of Japanese flat horse races

References

Horse races in Japan
Recurring sporting events established in 1993